(literally Yahya/John, son of Zechariah), identified in English as John the Baptist, is considered in Islam a prophet and messenger of God (Allah) who was sent to guide the Children of Israel. He is believed by Muslims to have been a witness to the word of God who would herald the coming of Isa Al-Masih (Jesus Christ).

Yahya is mentioned five times in the Quran.

Yahya is also honoured highly in Sufism as well as Islamic mysticism, primarily because of the Quran's description of John's chastity and kindness. Sufis have frequently applied commentaries on the passages on John in the Quran, primarily concerning the God-given gift of wisdom which he acquired in youth as well as his parallels with Jesus. Although several phrases used to describe John and Jesus are virtually identical in the Quran, the manner in which they are expressed is different.

Birth 
In the Quran, God frequently mentions Zakariya's continuous praying for the birth of a son. Zakariya's wife, was barren and therefore the birth of a child seemed impossible. As a gift from God, Zakariya was given a son by the name of Yaḥya, a name specially chosen for this child alone. In accordance with Zakariya's prayer, God made Yahya and Isa, who according to exegesis was born six months later, renew the message of God, which had been corrupted and distorted by the Israelites.

The Quran claims that John the Baptist was the first to receive this name but since the name Yoḥanan occurs many times before John the Baptist,  this verse is referring either to Islamic scholar consensus that "Yaḥyā" is not the same name as "Yoḥanan" or to the Biblical account of the miraculous naming of John, which accounted that he was almost named "Zacharias" (Greek: Ζαχαρίας) after his father's name, as no one in the lineage of his father Zacharias (also known as Zechariah) had been named "John" ("Yohanan"/"Yoannes") before him. As the Quran says:

Prophethood 
Yahya was exhorted to hold fast to the scripture and was given wisdom by God while still a child. He was pure and devout, and walked well in the presence of God. He was dutiful towards his parents and he was not arrogant or rebellious. John's reading and understanding of the scriptures, when only a child, surpassed even that of the greatest scholars of the time. Muslim exegesis narrates that Isa sent Yahya out with twelve disciples, who preached the message before Jesus called his own disciples. The Quran says:

John was a classical prophet, who was exalted high by God for his bold denouncing of all things sinful. Furthermore, the Quran speaks of John's gentle piety and love and his humble attitude towards life, for which he was granted the purity of Life.

According to Islamic tradition, Yahya used to go to the Al Haram Ash-Sharif (Temple Mount) to deliver his sermons.

Assassination 
During the prophethood of Yahya, a conflict occurred between him and Herod Antipas, who wanted to divorce his first wife and take as wife his former sister-in-law. Yahya informed that the marriage might be incestuous, and did not approve of the marriage. After this, Herod Antipas had Yahya imprisoned. Yahya was then decapitated. Yahya's head is believed to be inside the Umayyad Mosque in Damascus.

Legacy 
In Islam, Yahya greeted Muhammad on the night of the Al-Isra al-Mi'raj, along with Isa (Jesus), on the second heaven. Yahya's story was also told to the Abyssinian king during the Muslim migration to Abyssinia. According to the Quran, Yahya was one on whom God sent peace on the day that he was born and the day that he died. According to Al-Suyuti, Ibrahim stated that since the creation of the world the Heavens and the Earth wept only for two people, Yahya and Husayn. According to a Hadith, Muhammad said: "Every son of Adam will come on the day of Resurrection and he will have sin against him except Yahya ibn Zakaryya". Many Muslims compare Yahya with Husayn.

References

New Testament people in Islam
Prophets of the Quran